Governor Docking may refer to:

George Docking (1904–1964), 35th Governor of Kansas
Robert Docking (1925–1983), 38th Governor of Kansas